Midtown Marketplace is a shopping center located in Kansas City, Missouri on Linwood Boulevard & Main Street across the street from a Gates Bar.B.Q. restaurant in Union Hill. The location surrounds the area from Linwood Boulevard to 34th Street on the north/south and Main Street to Gillham Road on the west/east.

Tenants
23 East Linwood Boulevard
 Shawarmar Mediterranean Grill

111 East Linwood Boulevard
 Home Depot

123 East Linwood Boulevard
 Taco Bell

241 East Linwood Boulevard
 Costco

3215 Main Street
 Brooke Insurance
 Mattress Firm
 Select Physical Therapy
 SuperCuts

3255 Main Street
 McDonald's

3385 Main Street
 AmeriCash Loans
 LaMar's Donuts
 SERC Physical Therapy
 Verizon

Competition
 Linwood Shopping Center

References
 Midtown Marketplace hooks new tenants on Costco anchor
 LaMar's returns to Midtown in January

Economy of Kansas City, Missouri
Shopping malls in Missouri